The Deutsch limit is an aphorism about the information density of visual programming languages originated by L. Peter Deutsch that states:

The problem with visual programming is that you can’t have more than 50 visual primitives on the screen at the same time.

The term was made up by Fred Lakin, after Deutsch made the following comment at a talk on visual programming by Scott Kim and Warren Robinett: "Well, this is all fine and well, but the problem with visual programming languages is that you can’t have more than 50 visual primitives on the screen at the same time. How are you going to write an operating system?"

The primitives in a visual language are the separate graphical elements used to build a program, and having more of them available at the same time allows the programmer to read more information. This limit is sometimes cited as an example of the advantage of textual over visual languages, pointing out the greater information density of text, and posing a difficulty in scaling the language.

However, criticisms of the limit include that it is not clear whether a similar limit also exists in textual programming languages; and that the limit could be overcome by applying modularity to visual programming as is commonly done in textual programming.

See also 

 Cognitive dimensions of notations
 Conway's law

References

External links 
 Parsons and Cranshaw commentary on Deutsch Limit in "Patterns of Visual Programming"
 Baeza-Yates's commentary on Visual Programming

Computer programming
Adages
Computer programming folklore
Software engineering folklore
Programming principles
Visual programming languages